Mansoru Maha Samudram is a 1983 Indian Malayalam-language film, directed by P. K. Joseph. The film stars Mammootty, Ratheesh, Aruna and K. P. Ummer. The film has musical score by M. K. Arjunan.

Cast
Mammootty as Venugopal
Ratheesh as Sanjayan
Aruna as Renuka
K. P. Ummer as Ranjini's father
Seema as Ranjini
Philomina as Renuka's mother
Jagathy Sreekumar as Raghavan
Kaviyoor Ponnamma as Devaki
Sreenivasan as Pappu
Lalithasree as Meenakshi
Santo Krishnan

Soundtrack
The music was composed by M. K. Arjunan and the lyrics were written by Kanam E. J.

References

External links
 

1983 films
1980s Malayalam-language films
Films based on Malayalam novels